Quarrata is a comune (municipality) in the Province of Pistoia in the Italian region Tuscany, located about  west of Florence and about  south of Pistoia.

Main sights
Propositura (church) of Santa Maria Assunta
Pieve (pleban church) of San Bartolomeo at Tizzana, one of the frazioni of the municipality. Nearby are remains, including a standing watch tower, of the medieval castle
Villa La Magia, an example of Medici villa
Fattoria Santonuovo, an 18th-century patrician villa

Sport
The British Cycling academy has made Quarrata its training base for a number of years and as a result a number of British cyclists make their home in Quarrata, including Mark Cavendish, Steve Cummings, and Geraint Thomas.

Twin towns
 Vaslui, Romania
 Agounit, Western Sahara

References

External links

 Official website